Carlos Enríquez (born 22 May 1966) is an Ecuadorian footballer. He played in one match for the Ecuador national football team in 1987. He was also part of Ecuador's squad for the 1987 Copa América tournament.

References

External links
 

1966 births
Living people
Ecuadorian footballers
Ecuador international footballers
Place of birth missing (living people)
Association football goalkeepers